Muda (木达 or 母打) is a Loloish language of China.

There are over 2,000 Muda speakers in Nanlianshan Village Community 南联山村委会 (formerly Nanlianshan District, 南联山乡, now part of Gasa Township 嘎洒镇), Jinghong City, Yunnan, China (Xu 1991).

Classification
Xu (1991) classifies Muda as a Ha-Ya language (see Hani languages).

Hsiu (2018) classifies Muda as an Akha language containing a Bisoid substratum, with the substrate language being an early split from Bisoid. Muda has Cl- consonant clusters like various Bisoid languages, Siloid languages, and Jinuo, while words of Bisoid origin include 'leg', 'house', and 'smoke'.

Phonology
Muda has the complex consonant onsets  (Xu 1991:34).

Vocabulary
The following vocabulary of Muda is from Xu (1991).

References

Xu Shixuan [徐世璇] (1991). "Several types of sound changes in Lolo-Burmese languages [缅彝语几种音类的演变]." In Minzu Yuwen 1991(3), 34-41.
http://asiaharvest.org/wp-content/themes/asia/docs/people-groups/China/chinaPeoples/M/Muda.pdf

Southern Loloish languages
Languages of China